The 2011 Summer Tour was a co-headlining tour by American bands Maroon 5 and Train. Beginning in July 2011, the tour supported both of the bands' albums, Hands All Over and Save Me, San Francisco, respectively. The tour included more than 42 dates in the United States and Canada.

Opening acts
 Gavin DeGraw 
 PJ Morton 
 Matt Nathanson 
 Nikki Jean 
 Javier Colon 
 Stevie Nicks 
 Gentlemen Hall

Setlists

Tour dates

Notes

References 

2011 concert tours
Co-headlining concert tours
Maroon 5 concert tours
Train (band) concert tours
Concert tours of North America
Concert tours of the United States
Concert tours of Canada